"Never Enough" is a song by the American hard rock band Kiss. It was released on their 19th album Sonic Boom in 2009. It was released as a single on June 11, 2010. The song is the last single released from the album.

Live performances
"Never Enough" was not performed during the Sonic Boom Over Europe Tour and the more recent The Hottest Show On Earth Tour, it is unknown whether the band plans on performing the song on future tours.

Charts

Personnel
 Paul Stanley – rhythm guitar, lead vocals
 Gene Simmons – bass guitar, backing vocals
 Tommy Thayer – lead guitar, backing vocals
 Eric Singer – drums, backing vocals

References

Kiss (band) songs
2010 singles
Songs written by Paul Stanley
Songs written by Tommy Thayer
2008 songs
Roadrunner Records singles